Maxwell George Rippon (11 October 1920 – 12 July 1985) was an Australian rules footballer who played with Fitzroy, South Melbourne and St Kilda in the Victorian Football League (VFL).

Rippon was a wingman, who arrived at Fitzroy from Heatherton. He didn't have much impact in his one-season stints with Fitzroy and South Melbourne but was a regular fixture in the St Kilda team for three seasons. While at St Kilda in 1945 he had a teammate, Ted Rippon, who was his uncle. In 1946 he represented Victoria in an interstate fixture against South Australia. Once he left the VFL he continued his football career in the Victorian Football Association, with Brighton.

References

External links
Max Rippon's playing statistics from The VFA Project

1920 births
1985 deaths
Australian rules footballers from Melbourne
Fitzroy Football Club players
Sydney Swans players
St Kilda Football Club players
Brighton Football Club players
People from Cheltenham, Victoria